Fabiana Dadone (born 12 February 1984) is an Italian politician, who served as Minister for Youth Policies in the Draghi Cabinet between 2021 and 2022, as well as Minister of Public Administration in the Conte II Cabinet between 2019 and 2021.

Biography
Fabiana Dadone graduated in law from the University of Turin and was a practicing lawyer in Ceva; however, she never passed the exam for the habilitation to be a lawyer.

In 2013 she was elected to the Chamber of Deputies for the first time; she was then re-elected also in the 2018 election.

On 16 September 2018 The Blog of the Stars (official organ of the Five Star Movement) announced in a post that Fabiana Dadone became new contact of the "Rousseau platform" (the web platform created by Gianroberto Casaleggio), for the Network Shield function. She took the place of Alfonso Bonafede, who was appointed Minister of Justice in the first Conte Government.

On 25 June 2019, after being chosen by Luigi Di Maio, she was voted by the membership base to become a member of the Board of Arbitrators of the Five Star Movement.

On 4 September 2019, she was appointed Minister of Public Administration in the Conte II Cabinet.

On 13 February 2021, she was appointed Minister of Youth in the Draghi Cabinet.

References

External links

1984 births
21st-century Italian politicians
21st-century Italian women politicians
Politicians of Piedmont
People from Cuneo
Conte II Cabinet
Draghi Cabinet
Five Star Movement politicians
Deputies of Legislature XVII of Italy
Deputies of Legislature XVIII of Italy
Living people
Women government ministers of Italy
University of Turin alumni
Women members of the Chamber of Deputies (Italy)